Rhythm & Greens is an extended play 45 rpm record released by The Shadows in 1964. The music was the soundtrack from the Elstree Distributors Film, A.B.Pathé/Interstate Film of the same name, produced and directed by Christopher Miles. The recording was produced by Norrie Paramor. The record was released on Columbia and EMI in 1964 as number SEG  8362.

The title tune is the Shadows mild parody of the rhythm and blues craze that was sweeping Britain at that time, complete with grunts and moans and shaking maracas.

Track listing
Side 1
 Rhythm & Greens (Marvin-Welch-Bennett-Rostill)
 Ranka-Chank  (Marvin-Welch-Bennett-Rostill)

Side 2
 Main Theme  (Marvin-Welch-Bennett-Rostill)
 The Drum Number  (Marvin-Welch-Bennett-Rostill)
 The Lute Number  (Marvin-Welch-Bennett-Rostill)

Personnel
 Hank Marvin – Lead guitar
 Bruce Welch – Rhythm guitar
 John Rostill – Bass guitar
 Brian Bennett – Drums
 Norrie Paramor – Producer

References
Rhythm & Greens, Columbia Records, EMI, mono  SEG 8362, Dum Dum, India

1964 EPs
The Shadows EPs
EMI Columbia Records EPs